Polk County is located in the U.S. state of Iowa. As of the 2020 census, the population was 492,401. It is Iowa's most populous county, and home to over 15% of the state's residents. The county seat is Des Moines, which is also the capital city of Iowa. Polk County is included in the Des Moines–West Des Moines, IA Metropolitan Statistical Area.

History
On January 13, 1846, the legislative body of the Iowa Territory authorized the creation of twelve counties in the Territory, with general descriptions of their boundaries. On January 17 they further enacted a resolution setting the effective date of the county government for Jasper and Polk Counties as March 1, 1846. Polk County's name referred to United States President James K. Polk, who served from 1845 to 1849.

The first courthouse, a two-story structure, was built in Des Moines in 1846. Rapid settlement and commercial growth in the county soon rendered this building insufficient, so construction of a larger building was initiated in 1858. Due to construction delays and the onset of the Civil War, the structure was not completed until 1866. The present courthouse was erected in 1906, and in 1962 it was extensively renovated and enlarged.

Geography
The county is bisected by the Des Moines River.

Major highways
 Interstate 35
 Interstate 80
 Interstate 235
 U.S. Highway 6
 U.S. Highway 65
 U.S Route 69
 Iowa Highway 5
 Iowa Highway 17
 Iowa Highway 28
 Iowa Highway 141
 Iowa Highway 160
 Iowa Highway 163
 Iowa Highway 415

Transit
 Des Moines Area Regional Transit
 List of intercity bus stops in Iowa

Adjacent counties
Boone – northwest
Dallas – west
Jasper – east
Madison - southwest
Marion – southeast
Story – north
Warren – south

Communities

Cities

Alleman
Altoona
Ankeny
Bondurant
Carlisle
Clive
Des Moines
Elkhart
Granger
Grimes
Johnston
Mitchellville
Norwalk
Pleasant Hill
Polk City
Runnells
Sheldahl
Urbandale
West Des Moines
Windsor Heights

Census-designated place
Saylorville

Unincorporated communities

Avon
Berwick
Enterprise
Farrar
Herrold

Townships

Allen
Beaver
Bloomfield
Camp
Clay
Crocker
Delaware
Des Moines
Douglas
Elkhart
Four Mile
Franklin
Jefferson
Lee
Lincoln
Madison
Saylor
Union
Walnut
Washington
Webster

Demographics

2020 census
There were 210,184 housing units, of which 196,891 were occupied.

2010 census
There were 182,262 housing units, of which 170,197 were occupied.

2000 census

As of the census of 2000, there were 374,601 people, 149,112 households, and 96,624 families in the county. The racial makeup of the county was 88.34% White, 4.84% Black or African American, 0.27% Native American, 2.63% Asian, 0.06% Pacific Islander, 2.22% from other races, and 1.66% from two or more races. 4.40% of the population were Hispanic or Latino of any race. 25.9% were of German, 10.6% Irish, 9.0% English and 8.4% American ancestry.

Of the 149,112 households 32.20% had children under the age of 18 living with them, 51.00% were married couples living together, 10.30% had a female householder with no husband present, and 35.20% were non-families. 28.10% of households were one person and 8.60% were one person aged 65 or older. The average household size was 2.45 and the average family size was 3.04.

Age spread: 25.70% under the age of 18, 9.40% from 18 to 24, 32.20% from 25 to 44, 21.50% from 45 to 64, and 11.10% 65 or older. The median age was 34 years. For every 100 females, there were 94.20 males. For every 100 females age 18 and over, there were 90.70 males.

The median household income was $46,116 and the median family income was $56,560. Males had a median income of $37,182 versus $28,000 for females. The per capita income for the county was $23,654. About 5.30% of families and 7.90% of the population were below the poverty line, including 9.70% of those under age 18 and 6.40% of those age 65 or over.

Government and infrastructure
The Iowa Department of Corrections Iowa Correctional Institution for Women is in Mitchellville and in Polk County.

In the first third of the 20th century, Polk County was primarily Republican, backing its candidates in all presidential elections from 1896 to 1932 except for 1912 & 1916. From 1936 to 1980, the county was a swing county, only failing to back the national winner during that period in 1960 & 1968. Starting with the 1984 election, the county has become consistently Democratic like many midsize urban counties, backing the party's candidate in every presidential election from that point forward. Following national trends, suburbs of Des Moines such as Urbandale and Ankeny have changed from Republican strongholds into moderate areas.

Population ranking
The population ranking of the following table is based on the 2020 census of Polk County.

† county seat

Education
School districts include:
 Ankeny Community School District
 Ballard Community School District
 Bondurant-Farrar Community School District
 Carlisle Community School District
 Collins-Maxwell Community School District
 Dallas Center-Grimes Community School District
 Des Moines Independent Community School District
 Johnston Community School District
 Madrid Community School District
 North Polk Community School District
 PCM Community School District
 Saydel Community School District
 Southeast Polk Community School District
 Urbandale Community School District
 West Des Moines Community School District
 Woodward-Granger Community School District

See also

Polk County Courthouse
Iowa State Capitol
Terrace Hill also known as Hubbell Mansion, Benjamin F. Allen House, or the Iowa Governor's Mansion
National Register of Historic Places listings in Polk County, Iowa

References

External links
 
Polk County government website

 
1846 establishments in Iowa Territory
Des Moines metropolitan area
Populated places established in 1846